Wainwright is a town in east-central Alberta, Canada.

Highway 41, called the Buffalo Trail, and Highway 14 go through the town.
CFB Wainwright is located in Denwood, southwest of Wainwright.

History 
The original townsite opened with post office in 1907 along with Denwood Hotel and store. The post office and hotel (becoming Wainwright Hotel) relocated to Wainwright in 1908 with the old townsite later becoming CFB Wainwright.

The town is a divisional point on the Canadian National Railway main line. Wainwright railway station is served by Via Rail's  The Canadian.

Demographics 

In the 2016 Census of Population conducted by Statistics Canada, the Town of Wainwright recorded a population of 6,270 living in 2,524 of its 2,770 total private dwellings, a  change from its 2011 population of 5,925.

The Town of Wainwright's 2013 municipal census counted a population of 6,289, an 8.9% increase over its 2008 municipal census population of 5,775.

Arts and culture 
Wainwright has the third-largest stampede in Canada. It occurs at the end of June, and includes a rodeo, chuckwagon races, parade, midway, and an agricultural fair.

Education 
Buffalo Trail Public Schools Regional Division No. 28
Wainwright Elementary School
Wainwright High School
East Central Alberta Catholic Separate Schools Regional Division No. 16
Blessed Sacrament School
Blessed Sacrament Outreach School
Greater North Central Francophone Education Region No. 2
École Saint-Christophe

Media 
Radio
CKKY-FM/K-Rock 101.9 – provides old and new rock music
CKWY-FM/Wayne-FM – provides a mix of classic hits and top 40 music

Newspapers
The Edge and The Star (formerly the Star Chronicle) merged to be the Star/Edge in 2013. It is published weekly on Fridays.

Notable people 
Glen Sather, former NHL player, coach and general manager, and member of the Hockey Hall of Fame
Lynn Seymour, ballerina
Frank C. Turner, film and television actor, iconographer
Bobby McMann, NHL player for the Toronto Maple Leafs

See also 
List of communities in Alberta
List of towns in Alberta

References

External links 

1909 establishments in Alberta
Towns in Alberta